John Jacob ("Jack" or J.J.) Eller, Jr. (October 15, 1883 – January 20, 1967) was an American track and field athlete, a member of the Irish American Athletic Club and a member of the New York City Police Department from 1905 to 1942. Eller was a five-time Amateur Athletic Union champion in the 220 yard low hurdles between 1907 and 1912. He competed as a member of the U.S. Olympic team in the 1912 Summer Olympics. (John's brother Robert Eller was also an athlete, who competed for Fordham University and the Irish American Athletic Club.

In 1910, Eller was considered 'King of the Hurdlers.' "He held the world's record for the 220 yard, 2 foot 6 inch hurdle made at Travers Island in 1908, the time being 24 4/6 seconds and also the 220 yard 3ft. 6in. hurdles made at Celtic Prk in October, 1908 in 27 and 3/5 seconds." Also in 1908, Eller won the 150 yard, 200 yard and 220 yard hurdle indoor championships, securing three first prizes all in one night. In 1909, Eller won both the 120 yard high hurdle and the 220 yard low hurdles, coming close to securing a record in the latter."

In 1912 he was eliminated in the semi-finals of the 110 metre hurdles competition. He also participated in the pentathlon event but quit after three disciplines, with the victory going to Jim Thorpe.

Notes

References
 
 
Police Athletes of the Past: John Eller –  Spring 3100

External links

Archives of Irish America – NYU
Winged Fist Organization
John Jacob Eller Jr, – Motorcycle Cop and 'King Hurdler.'

1883 births
1967 deaths
American male hurdlers
New York City Police Department officers
American pentathletes
Olympic track and field athletes of the United States
Athletes (track and field) at the 1912 Summer Olympics
Track and field athletes from New Jersey
People from Cutchogue, New York
Track and field athletes from New York City